Noni the Pony Goes to the Beach a 2014 children's picture book by Alison Lester. It is about a pony called Noni who, with her friends Dave dog and Coco the cat, spends a day by the seaside.

Publication history
2014, Australia, Allen & Unwin 
2015, USA, Beach Lane Books

Reception
A review in School Library Journal of Noni the Pony Goes to the Beach stated "A perfect blend of text and pictures makes this an outstanding offering for the youngest crowd."

Noni the Pony Goes to the Beach has also been reviewed by The New York Times, Horn Book Guide Reviews, Scan, and Magpies. 

It is a 2015 Children's Book Council of Australia (CBCA) Early Childhood Honour book, and appears on a CBCA favourite books list.

The National Centre for Australian Children's Literature holds preliminary and final artwork for the book.

See also
Noni the Pony
Noni the Pony Rescues a Joey

References

External links

Library holdings of Noni the Pony Goes to the Beach

2014 children's books
Australian picture books
Children's poetry books
Allen & Unwin books
Pony books